Goliath Against the Giants is a 1961 Italian film directed by Guido Malatesta. It was Brad Harris's debut as a lead actor.

Cast 

 Brad Harris: Goliath 
 Gloria Milland: Princess Elea 
 Fernando Rey: Bokan
 Barbara Carroll: Daina 
 Carmen de Lirio: Diamira 
 Pepe Rubio: Briseo (credited as José Rubio) 
 Fernando Sancho: Namathos  
 Nello Pazzafini: Jagoran

Release
Goliath Against the Giants was released as Goliath contro I giganti in Italy on 14 May 1961. It was released in the United States on 14 April 1963.

Reception
A review in the Monthly Film Bulletin referred to the film as "dispiriting compendrium of strip-cartoon cliches whose rousingly and absurdly crowded climax fails to compensate for inexperienced direction, murky colour photography and shame-faced cutting."

See also
 List of Italian films of 1961

References

Bibliography

External links

1961 films
Films directed by Guido Malatesta
Peplum films
1960s adventure films
Films set in classical antiquity
Films about dragons
Films shot in Almería
Sword and sandal films
Goliath
1960s Italian films